Town Hall Seattle, or Town Hall locally, is a cultural center and performance hall located on Seattle, Washington, USA's First Hill at 1119 8th Ave. Built as Fourth Church of Christ, Scientist, Seattle, a Church of Christ, Scientist church, from 1916 to 1922, it was sold by the church to its current owners in 1998 and reopened in 1999. In 2017, Town Hall announced they raised $20 million for a "top-to-bottom" renovation. In January 2019, they announced construction issues delayed their planned reopening. Town Hall officially completed construction and reopened its doors to the public on May 16, 2019.

It was designated a Seattle Landmark in 2012 and was listed on the National Register of Historic Places as "Fourth Church of Christ, Scientist" in 2013.

References

Further reading
 Safronoff, Cindy Peyser. (2020) Dedication: Building the Seattle Branches of Mary Baker Eddy's Church, A Centennial Story - Part 1: 1889 to 1929. Seattle: this one thing.

External links

 Official site
 Town Hall (Seattle) at HistoryLink

Buildings and structures in Seattle
Culture of Seattle
Tourist attractions in Seattle
Churches completed in 1922
Former Christian Science churches, societies and buildings in Washington (state)
Landmarks in Seattle
Downtown Seattle
Music venues in Washington (state)
National Register of Historic Places in Seattle